Rex Kramer may refer to:
Rex Kramer, Danger Seeker, a character in the 1977 American comedy film The Kentucky Fried Movie
Rex Kramer, a character in the 1980 American comedy film Airplane!
"Rex Kramer", a song by Gomez from their 2002 album In Our Gun